Nemacheilus pallidus is a species of ray-finned fish in the genus Nemacheilus which occurs in the lower Mekong basin in Thailand, Laos, Cambodia and Vietnam, as well as in the Chao Phraya and Maeklong basins in Thailand.

Footnotes 

 

P
Fish described in 1990